Moldova participated in the Eurovision Song Contest 2009 with the song "Hora din Moldova" written by Veaceslav Daniliu, Andrei Hadjiu, Nelly Ciobanu and Aristotelis Kalimeris. The song was performed by Nelly Ciobanu. The Moldovan broadcaster TeleRadio-Moldova (TRM) organised the national final O melodie pentru Europa 2009 in order to select the Moldovan entry for the 2009 contest in Moscow, Russia. 39 entries competed to represent Moldova in Moscow, with 20 being shortlisted to participate in the televised national final which took place on 14 February 2009. "Hora din Moldova" performed by Nelly Ciobanu emerged as the winner after gaining the most points following the combination of votes from a jury panel, a committee and a public televote.

Moldova was drawn to compete in the second semi-final of the Eurovision Song Contest which took place on 14 May 2009. Performing during the show in position 15, "Hora din Moldova" was announced among the 10 qualifying entries of the second semi-final and therefore qualified to compete in the final on 16 May. It was later revealed that Moldova placed fifth out of the 19 participating countries in the semi-final with 106 points. In the final, Moldova performed in position 13 and placed fourteenth out of the 25 participating countries, scoring 69 points.

Background 

Prior to the 2009 Contest, Moldova had participated in the Eurovision Song Contest four times since its first entry in 2005. The nation's best placing in the contest was sixth, which it achieved in 2005 with the song "Boonika bate doba" performed by Zdob și Zdub. Other than their debut entry, to this point, Moldova's only other top ten placing at the contest was achieved in 2007 where "Fight" performed by Natalia Barbu placed tenth. In the 2008 contest, "A Century of Love" performed by Geta Burlacu failed to qualify Moldova to compete in the final.

The Moldovan national broadcaster, TeleRadio-Moldova (TRM), broadcast the event within Moldova and organised the selection process for the nation's entry. TRM confirmed their intentions to participate at the 2009 Eurovision Song Contest on 13 November 2008. Moldova has selected their entry via a national selection show since 2008, a procedure that was continued for their 2009 participation.

Before Eurovision

O melodie pentru Europa 2009 
O melodie pentru Europa 2009 was the national final format developed by TRM in order to select Moldova's entry for the Eurovision Song Contest 2009. The event took place at the Theatre of Opera and Ballet in Chişinău, hosted by Rusalina Rusu and Serj Kuzenkoff, and included a final to be held on 14 February 2009. The show was broadcast on Moldova 1, TV Moldova Internațional and Radio Moldova as well as online via TRM's official website trm.md.

Competing entries 
Artists and composers had the opportunity to submit their entries between 10 November 2008 to 20 December 2008. Artists were required to be of Moldovan nationality and could submit more than one song, while songwriters could hold any nationality. At the conclusion of the submission deadline, 39 valid entries were received by the broadcaster. A nine-member jury consisting of composers, lyricists, producers and singers selected 20 finalists out of the 39 received entries, which were announced on 9 January 2009. On 7 February 2009, "So Alive" performed by 2006 Moldovan Eurovision entrant Natalia Gordienko, "Run Away" performed by Edict and "Love Is in the Air" performed by Olia Tira were withdrawn from the competition and replaced with the songs "Hei! Exploadează!" performed by Doiniţa Gherman, "Lerui - ler" performed by Veronica Stolli and "7 Days" performed by Corbus Albus.

Final 
The final took place on 14 February 2009. Twenty songs competed and the winner was selected based on the combination of a public televote, the votes of an expert jury and the votes of a committee consisting of TRM and Orange Moldova representatives. In addition to the performances of the competing entries, 2009 Romanian Eurovision entrant Elena Gheorghe and singer Ionel Istrati performed as guests, while 2009 Azerbaijani Eurovision entrant AySel appeared during the show where she premiered a teaser of the 2009 Azerbaijani entry "Always". "Hora din Moldova" performed by Nelly Ciobanu was selected as the winner.

Preparation 
Following the national final, it was revealed that "Hora din Moldova" would be performed bilingually in Romanian and English at the contest, the latter of which was written by Aristotelis Kalimeris. The final version of the song together with the official music video premiered on 27 March.

Promotion 
Nelly Ciobanu made several appearances across Europe to specifically promote "Hora din Moldova" as the Moldovan Eurovision entry. On 18 April, Nelly Ciobanu performed during the Eurovision Promo Concert, which was held at the Amsterdam Marcanti venue in Amsterdam, Netherlands and hosted by Marga Bult and Maggie MacNeal. On 18 and 19 April, Ciobanu took part in promotional activities in Belgium and performed at the Place Sainte-Catherine venue in Brussels. Nelly Ciobanu also took part in promotional activities in Romania where she was a guest during programmes on Antena 1 and Pro TV.

At Eurovision 

According to Eurovision rules, all nations with the exceptions of the host country and the "Big Four" (France, Germany, Spain and the United Kingdom) are required to qualify from one of two semi-finals in order to compete for the final; the top nine songs from each semi-final as determined by televoting progress to the final, and a tenth was determined by back-up juries. The European Broadcasting Union (EBU) split up the competing countries into six different pots based on voting patterns from previous contests, with countries with favourable voting histories put into the same pot. On 30 January 2009, a special allocation draw was held which placed each country into one of the two semi-finals. Moldova was placed into the second semi-final, to be held on 14 May 2009. The running order for the semi-finals was decided through another draw on 16 March 2009 and Moldova was set to perform in position 15, following the entry from Lithuania and before the entry from Albania.

The two semi-finals and the final were televised in Moldova on Moldova 1 and TV Moldova Internațional. All broadcasts featured commentary by Rusalina Rusu and Andrei Sava. The Moldovan spokesperson, who announced the Moldovan votes during the final, was 2008 Moldova Eurovision representative Geta Burlacu.

Semi-final 
Nelly Ciobanu took part in technical rehearsals on 6 and 10 May, followed by dress rehearsals on 13 and 14 May. The Moldovan performance featured Ciobanu dressed in a short white dress with a green pinafore and purple embroidered flowers as well as purple boots, and performing on stage with four dancers and a backing vocalist who waved a wooden stick with colourful ribbons attached to its top, all of them which were dressed in national costumes. The stage featured LED screen projections of embroidery patterns and a stylized dancing couple in front of a black background. The backing vocalist that joined Nelly Ciobanu on stage is Gicu Cimbir.

At the end of the show, Moldova was announced as having finished in the top ten and subsequently qualifying for the grand final. It was later revealed that Moldova placed fifth in the semi-final, receiving a total of 106 points.

Final 
Shortly after the second semi-final, a winners' press conference was held for the ten qualifying countries. As part of this press conference, the qualifying artists took part in a draw to determine the running order for the final. This draw was done in the order the countries appeared in the semi-final running order. Moldova was drawn to perform in position 12, following the entry from Bosnia and Herzegovina and before the entry from Malta.

Nelly Ciobanu once again took part in dress rehearsals on 15 and 16 May before the final, including the jury final where the professional juries cast their final votes before the live show. Ciobanu performed a repeat of her semi-final performance during the final on 16 May. At the conclusion of the voting, Moldova finished in fourteenth place with 69 points.

Voting 
The voting system for 2009 involved each country awarding points from 1-8, 10 and 12, with the points in the final being decided by a combination of 50% national jury and 50% televoting. Each nation's jury consisted of five music industry professionals who are citizens of the country they represent. This jury judged each entry based on: vocal capacity; the stage performance; the song's composition and originality; and the overall impression by the act. In addition, no member of a national jury was permitted to be related in any way to any of the competing acts in such a way that they cannot vote impartially and independently.

Following the release of the full split voting by the EBU after the conclusion of the competition, it was revealed that Moldova had placed thirteenth with the public televote and tenth with the jury vote in the final. In the public vote, Moldova scored 66 points, while with the jury vote, Moldova scored 93 points.

Below is a breakdown of points awarded to Moldova and awarded by Moldova in the second semi-final and grand final of the contest. The nation awarded its 12 points to Azerbaijan in the semi-final and to Romania in the final of the contest.

Points awarded to Moldova

Points awarded by Moldova

Detailed voting results

References

External links
All 37 songs from Moldova Eurovision 2009

2009
Countries in the Eurovision Song Contest 2009
Eurovision